Events in the year 2023 in Spain.

Incumbents 
 Monarch: Felipe VI
 Prime Minister: Pedro Sánchez
 President of the Congress of Deputies: Meritxell Batet
 President of the Senate of Spain: Ander Gil
 President of the Supreme Court: Carlos Lesmes
 President of the Constitutional Court: Pedro González-Trevijano
 Attorney General: Dolores Delgado
 Chief of the Defence Staff: Teodoro Esteban López Calderón
 Sánchez II Government

Regional presidents 

 Andalusia: Juan Manuel Moreno Bonilla
 Aragón: Javier Lambán
 Asturias: Adrián Barbón
 Balearic Islands: Francina Armengol
 Basque Country: Iñigo Urkullu
 Canary Islands: Ángel Víctor Torres
 Cantabria: Miguel Ángel Revilla
 Castilla–La Mancha: Emiliano García-Page
 Castile and León: Alfonso Fernández Mañueco
 Catalonia: Pere Aragonès
 Extremadura: Guillermo Fernández Vara
 Galicia: Alberto Núñez Feijóo
 La Rioja: Concha Andreu
 Community of Madrid: Isabel Díaz Ayuso
 Region of Murcia: Fernando López Miras
 Navarre: María Chivite
 Valencian Community: Ximo Puig
 Ceuta: Juan Jesús Vivas
 Melilla: Eduardo de Castro

Events

January 
 4 January – The Supreme Court of Spain says that it will investigate two sons of Teodoro Obiang Nguema Mbasogo, president of Equatorial Guinea over the kidnapping and torture of two Spanish citizens who oppose Obiang's rule.
 18 January – The People's Party President of Castile and León Alfonso Fernández Mañueco rejects anti-abortion proposals by coalition partner Vox.
 25 January – Algeciras church attacks: One person is killed and four others are wounded when a man wielding a machete breaks into two churches in Algeciras, Andalusia, in attacks treated as Islamic terrorism by authorities. A Moroccan illegal immigrant is arrested.

March 

 9 March – Three people are killed after a mine tunnel collapses in Catalonia.

Predicted and scheduled events 
2023 Spanish general election
2023 Spanish local elections
24th Annual Latin Grammy Awards

Deaths 
 3 January – 
 Elena Huelva, 20, influencer and writer.
 Nicolás Redondo, 95, union leader and politician, secretary general of the UGT (1976–1994) and deputy (1977–1987).
 Sergi Schaaff, 85, television producer (Saber y ganar, Ruta Quetzal).
 5 January – 
 Toni Batllori, 71–72, cartoonist.
 Mondeño, 88, torero.
 10 January – 
 Jorge Ballesteros, 39, sports shooter.
 José Evangelista, 79, composer.
 17 January – Josep Rahola i d'Espona, 104, engineer and politician, senator (1979–1986).
 20 January – Xavier Albó, 88, Jesuit priest, linguist and anthropologist.

References 

 
Spain
Spain
2020s in Spain
Years of the 21st century in Spain